Mue (French "the moulting") is Émilie Simon's sixth studio album, released by Barclay Records on 17 March 2014.

Track listing

Personnel
 Emilie Simon — vocals, keyboards and guitar 
 Gary Barnacle — saxophones and flutes
 Nik Carter — saxophones and clarinets
 Jack Birchwood — trumpet
 Steven Fuller — trombone
 Nicolas Bauguil — guitars
 Tahiti Boy — keyboards
 Leon Michels — optigan
 Simon Edwards — bass
 Martyn Barker, Raphael Seguinier — drums
 Sally Herbert — strings 
 Catherine Michel — harp
 Cyrille Brissot — programming 
 Ian Caple — engineering and co-production

References

Émilie Simon albums
2014 albums
Pop rock albums by French artists